The 2015–16 CEV Women's Challenge Cup was the 36th edition of the European Challenge Cup volleyball club tournament, the former "CEV Cup".

Format
The tournament was played on a knockout format, with a total of 46 teams participating. Initially 30 teams were allocated vacancies to enter the competition at the 'Qualification phase', with another 16 teams joining from the Women's CEV Cup entering the competition at the 'Main phase' stage (as per 'Round composition' below).

On 5 June 2015, a drawing of lots in Luxembourg City, Luxembourg, determined the team's pairing for each match. Each team played a home and an away match with result points awarded for each leg (3 points for 3–0 or 3–1 wins, 2 points for 3–2 win, 1 point for 2–3 loss). After two legs, the team with the most result points advanced to the next round. The Golden Set winner is the team that first obtains 15 points, provided that the points difference between the two teams is at least 2 points (thus, the Golden Set is similar to a tiebreak set in a normal match).

Round composition
 2nd Round: 30 teams
 16th Final: 2nd Round winners (16 teams) + 16 teams from CEV Cup
 8th Final onwards: winners

Participating teams
A total of 46 teams participated, 30 were allocated direct places and 16 joined from the Women's CEV Cup entering at the 'Main phase'.

1.Team qualified via CEV Cup entering the 16th Final.

Qualification phase

2nd round
1st leg (Team #1 home) 10–12 November 2015
2nd leg (Team #2 home) 24–26 November 2015

*Note: Stod Volley Steinkjer withdrew from the competition. The CEV awarded Wovo Rovaniemi both matches by 3–0.

Main phase
In this stage of the competition, the sixteen qualified teams of the Qualification phase were joined by the sixteen losing teams from the 2015–16 Women's CEV Cup.

16th final
1st leg (Team #1 home) 8–10 December 2015
2nd leg (Team #2 home) 15–17 December 2015

8th final
1st leg (Team #1 home) 19–21 January 2016
2nd leg (Team #2 home) 26–28 January 2016

4th final

1st leg (Team #1 home) 9–11 February 2016
2nd leg (Team #2 home) 23–25 February 2016

Final phase

Semi-finals
1st leg (Team #1 home) 9 March 2016
2nd leg (Team #2 home) 13 March 2016

Finals
1st leg (Team #1 home) 30 March 2016
2nd leg (Team #2 home) 3 April 2016

Awards

References

External links
 Challenge Cup 15-16

CEV Women's Challenge Cup
CEV Women's Challenge Cup
CEV Women's Challenge Cup